Salyan Olympic Sport Complex Stadium is located in Salyan, Azerbaijan. It is used by FK Mughan and has a seating capacity of 2000 spectators.

External links
FK Mugan's Site

See also
List of football stadiums in Azerbaijan

Sport in Azerbaijan
Football venues in Azerbaijan